Salomon August Andrée (18 October 1854, in Gränna, Småland – October 1897, in Kvitøya, Arctic Norway), during his lifetime most often known as S. A. Andrée, was a Swedish engineer,  physicist, aeronaut and polar explorer who died while leading an attempt to reach the Geographic North Pole by hydrogen balloon. The balloon expedition was unsuccessful in reaching the Pole and resulted in the deaths of all three of its participants.

Early life and influences
Andrée was born in the small town of Gränna, Sweden; he was very close to his mother, especially after the death of his father in 1870.  He attended the Royal Institute of Technology in Stockholm and graduated with a degree in mechanical engineering in 1874.  In 1876, he went to the Centennial Exposition in Philadelphia, where he was employed as a janitor at the Swedish Pavilion.  During his trip to the United States he read a book on trade winds and met the American balloonist John Wise; these encounters initiated his lifelong fascination with balloon travel.  He returned to Sweden and opened a machine shop where he worked until 1880; it was less than successful and he soon looked for other employment.

From 1880 to 1882, he was an assistant at the Royal Institute of Technology, and in 1882–1883, he participated in a Swedish scientific expedition to Spitsbergen led by Nils Ekholm, where Andrée was responsible for the observations regarding air electricity. From 1885 to his death, he was employed by the Swedish patent office. From 1891 to 1894, he was also a liberal member of the Stockholm city council. As a scientist, Andrée published scientific journals about air electricity, conduction of heat, and inventions. A keen friend of Jonas Patrik Ljungström, he notably educated the former's sons Birger, and Fredrik Ljungström.

His view of life was that of the natural sciences, and he entirely lacked interest in art or literature. He was a believer in industrial and technical development, and claimed also that emancipation of women would come as a consequence of technical progress.

Expedition to the North Pole

Supported by the Royal Swedish Academy of Sciences and funded by people like King Oscar II and Alfred Nobel, his polar exploration project was the subject of enormous interest and was seen as a brave and patriotic scheme.
 
The North Pole expedition made a first attempt to launch the balloon Örnen (The Eagle) in the summer of 1896 from Danes Island, an island in the west of the Svalbard Archipelago, but the winds did not permit the expedition to start. When Andrée next tried, on 11 July 1897, together with his companions engineer Knut Frænkel and photographer Nils Strindberg (a second cousin of playwright August Strindberg), the balloon did set off and sailed for 65 hours. This was not directed flight, however; already at the lift-off the gondola had lost two of the three sliding ropes that were supposed to drag on the ice and thus function as a kind of rudder (this was observed by the ground crew). And within ten hours of lift-off, they were caught by powerful winds from a storm raging in the area. The heavy winds continued and, together with the rain creating ice on the balloon, impeded the flight. It is likely that Andrée realized before the flight ended that they would never come near the pole.

For these reasons, they were forced down onto the ice, though the landing was conducted in a semi-controlled way rather than actually crashing. They had covered 295 miles (475 km) and foundered on the pack ice. The expedition was well equipped for travelling on the ice (three sledges and a boat) and had supplies for three months; also there were three deposits in northern Svalbard and one in Franz Josef Land. They set off eastbound for the latter, but after a week they had moved west due to the currents which moved the ice. They then changed direction towards northern Svalbard; movement was slowed down by ice drift and by the craggy surface of the pack ice. The three had to pull the sledges themselves, and despite good reserves of food supplemented by shooting polar bears, the efforts against the moving, uneven ice wore them out.

They reached land in early October after over two months on the ice, setting foot on Kvitøya (White Island), just east of Svalbard. They perished there, probably within two weeks after landfall. Most modern writers agree that Nils Strindberg died within a week of arrival: he was buried among the rocks (though no marker was placed on his grave) while the other two men were later found in the tent.

Diary notes and observations end just a few days after they landed on Kvitøya; up to that point these had been kept up even in hard conditions; this seems to indicate that something critical happened after a few days. It is likely that Strindberg met his end at this point. It has not been possible to establish the reason for his death. Suicide (which would have been possible with opium) is very unlikely in his case even though by this time all three no doubt realized they would die. Whatever Strindberg might have felt about the outcome of the expedition, it is near certain that he would have judged the option of suicide as treachery to his fellow explorers.

The diary notes of the expedition indicate that all three men were sometimes plagued by digestive trouble, illness and exhaustion during the trek over the sea ice. The ultimate cause of death probably had something to do with the ingestion of polar bear flesh carrying Trichinella parasites, which were found in the remains of a polar bear on the spot examined by the Danish physician Ernst Tryde and published in a book in 1952 called "The Dead on White Island". There is no doubt that the men became infected at some point during the ice trek, though the exact time span is unclear (and this matters because humans normally develop immunity to trichinosis if they survive the first wave of infection). When they arrived at White Island they were suffering from recurrent diarrhea. A plausible indication of this is that some of the provisions they brought ashore (obviously after a few days of scouting to the west) were unloaded and left near the water and not carried to a safer place near the camp.

In contrast, Arctic explorer Vilhjalmur Stefansson theorized in his book 'Unsolved Mysteries of the Arctic' that Nils Strindberg probably had died while chasing a polar bear, perhaps from drowning, and Andrée and Frænkel had asphyxiated on carbon monoxide from a malfunctioning stove while cooking in their tent.  To account for the unburned amount of fuel in the stove Stefansson referred to his own experience with malfunctioning stoves that required regular pumping up to keep burning.  In his opinion they had not lost hope of getting back, but they had made many mistakes and would have died of something else if they hadn't died when they did.

Aftermath
Until Andrée's last camp was found in 1930, the expedition's fate was the subject of myth and rumours.  At the time of the disappearance, it was noted that a heavy storm had been raging and that the balloon had lost its steering lines at departure. This led experienced polar explorers to surmise that the expedition could not have got very far and had probably been forced down onto the ice. In 1898, eleven months after Andrée's first sighting of White Island (which he called New Iceland) a Swedish polar expedition led by A. G. Nathorst passed offshore just 1 km from the camp, but bad weather prevented their landing. The remnants of the camp finally were found in 1930 by the Norwegian Bratvaag Expedition, which picked up remains, including two bodies. A month later, the ship M/K Isbjørn, hired by a newspaper, made additional finds, among them the third body. Notebooks, diaries, photographic negatives, the boat, various utensils and other objects were recovered. The homecoming of the bodies of Andrée and his colleagues Strindberg and Frænkel was a national event. King Gustaf V delivered an oration, and the explorers received a funeral with great honours. The three explorers were cremated and their ashes interred together at the cemetery Norra begravningsplatsen in Stockholm.

Modern assessments
Starting in the 1960s, Andrée's status as a national hero was increasingly questioned and a cooler, more skeptical view began to prevail, in a way not unlike the changing assessment of Robert Falcon Scott's South polar journey. Emphasis has been placed on the view that the expedition was bound to fail, and that Andrée refused to take in information that questioned the expedition's feasibility. He also had limited flight experience with large balloons, and none in Arctic conditions. Andrée has been seen as a manipulator of the national emotions of his age, bringing a meaningless death on himself and his two companions. Several modern writers, following Per Olof Sundman's Andrée portrait in the semidocumentary novel Flight of the Eagle ("Ingenjör Andrées luftfärd", 1967), have speculated that Andrée, by the time of the departure for Svalbard in 1897, had become the prisoner of his own successful funding campaign and of heightened national expectations, and was by then incapable of backing out or admitting weaknesses in his plans in front of the press.

Legacy
Andrée Land in Greenland was named after him by Swedish Arctic explorer A.G. Nathorst.

The Italian poet Giovanni Pascoli wrote a poem about Andrée's expedition and death.

Andrée's writings were adapted into the song cycle The Andrée Expedition by the American composer Dominick Argento, written for the Swedish baritone Håkan Hagegård. Swedish composer Klas Torstensson's opera "Expeditionen" (1994–99) is also based on Andrée's story.

Historian Edward Guimont has proposed that the 1930 discovery of the expedition's remains influenced H. P. Lovecraft in the writing of At the Mountains of Madness.

In 1982, the Swedish filmmaker Jan Troell directed a film based on Sundman's book, Flight of the Eagle.

In 2010, the American rock group Brian's Escape created a seven-track concept album inspired by Andrée's adventures entitled The Journey: An Account of S. A. Andrée's Arctic Expedition of 1897.

The 2010 novel Strindberg's Star by Swedish writer Jan Wallentin revolves around the story of the expedition.  The explorers reportedly found two relics which opened a portal to the Norse underworld and set off a chain of events connecting both world wars and the modern day with ancient Norse myths.

In 2012, English band The Greenland Choir included a song Reindeer, 1897 on their E.P. Here we are, wandering around like ghosts, which was inspired by Andrée.

In 2013, UK/ Norway theatre company New International Encounter (NIE) created a show charting the story of the ice balloon in co-production with The North Wall Oxford and The Key Theatre. North North North premiered at The Key Theatre, Peterborough on May 9, 2013, and toured across the UK and internationally.

A 2013 novel Expeditionen : min kärlekshistoria by Swedish writer Bea Uusma retells the story from the point of view of Strindberg's love for his fiancée, Anna Charlier.

Footnotes

References
  Ahlman, Axel (1928) Isviddernas hjältar (Heroes of the realm of ice), ed. Gleerup, Lund, Sweden - popular book on polar expeditions; the author had long experience of treks in the Arctic Ocean and makes a detailed analysis of what might have happened to Andrée.
  Andrée, S.A., Fraenkel, K and Strindberg, N. (1930), Med Örnen mot polen (With the Eagle towards the pole) ed. Bonniers, Stockholm - original chronicle and publication of the diaries and notes of the expedition, and some of its photographs.
  Kjellström, Rolf (1999). "Andrée-expeditionen och dess undergång: tolkning nu och då", in The Centennial of S.A. Andrée's North Pole Expedition: Proceedings of a Conference on S.A. Andrée and the Agenda for Social Science research of the Polar Regions, ed. Urban Wråkberg. Stockholm: Center for History of Science, Royal Swedish Academy of Sciences.
 Lundström, Sven (1997). "Vår position är ej synnerligen god..." Andréexpeditionen i svart och vitt. Borås: Carlssons förlag. Lundström is the curator of the Andreexpedition Polarcenter in Gränna, Sweden. This museum has been mainly dedicated to Andrées polar expedition.
  Sörlin, Sverker. Entries Andrée, Salomon August and Andrée-expeditionen in the web version of the encyclopedia Nationalencyklopedin, accessed April 27, 2006 (Swedish)
  Nordisk familjebok, 2nd edition, the entry Andrée, Salomon August (Swedish; written several years before the final fate of the expedition was discovered)
Sollinger, Guenther (2005), S.A. Andree: The Beginning of Polar Aviation 1895-1897. Moscow. Russian Academy of Sciences.
Sollinger, Guenther (2005), S.A. Andree and Aeronautics: An Annotated Bibliography. Moscow. Russian Academy of Sciences.

External links 

 
 
 
 
 

1854 births
1897 deaths
Burials at Norra begravningsplatsen
Explorers of the Arctic
KTH Royal Institute of Technology alumni
People from Jönköping Municipality
Swedish balloonists
Swedish engineers
Swedish explorers
Swedish mechanical engineers
Kvitøya